"Soul Man" is a 1967 song written and composed by Isaac Hayes and David Porter, first successful as a number 2 hit single by Atlantic Records soul duo Sam & Dave, which consisted of Samuel "Sam" Moore and David "Dave" Prater. In 2019, "Soul Man" was selected for preservation in the National Recording Registry as "culturally, historically, and aesthetically significant" by the Library of Congress. It was No. 463 in "Top 500 Greatest Songs of All Time" by Rolling Stone Magazine in 2010 and No. 458 in 2004.

Song history and background
Co-author Isaac Hayes found the inspiration for "Soul Man" in the turmoil of the Civil Rights Movement of the 1960s. In July 1967, watching a television newscast of the aftermath of the 12th Street riot in Detroit, Michigan, Hayes noted that black residents had marked buildings that had not been destroyed during the riots – mostly African-American owned and operated institutions – with the word "soul". Relating this occurrence to the biblical story of the Passover, Hayes and songwriting partner David Porter came up with the idea, in Hayes's words, of "a story about one's struggle to rise above his present conditions. It's almost a tune kind of like boasting, 'I'm a soul man.' It's a pride thing."

Sam sings the first verse, with Dave joining in the chorus. Dave sings the second verse, with Sam joining in the chorus. Sam sings the third verse, with Dave joining in the chorus, followed by a brief bridge section by Dave and then a coda, in which both Sam and Dave repeat the title phrase a half-step up, before the song's fade.

The exclamation "Play it, Steve" heard in the song refers to guitarist Steve Cropper of Booker T. & the M.G.'s, the house band who provided the instrumentation for it and other Sam and Dave singles. Cropper provided guitar for both the original Sam and Dave recording as well as the live and studio covers by the Blues Brothers.

Issued on the Atlantic-distributed Stax label for which Hayes and Porter worked, Sam and Dave's "Soul Man" was the most successful Stax single to date upon its release. The single peaked at number one on the Billboard Hot Rhythm & Blues Singles chart. "Soul Man" went to number two on the Billboard Hot 100 in the United States during the autumn of 1967. Outside the US, it peaked at number two in Canada. "Soul Man" was awarded the 1968 Grammy Award for Best Rhythm & Blues Group Performance, Vocal or Instrumental.

Original and alternative recordings
During the same session, two versions of "Soul Man" were recorded, and both were subsequently released. The distinct difference between the two versions can be found within the first 30 seconds of the song. One version opens the tune with a more enthusiastic Sam Moore singing the words "Comin' to you...," whereas in the other version, the opening lyrical line is "Comin' to ya...,". The latter rendition is the more readily available version in all formats; the former rendition, on original 45-rpm vinyl pressings, tends to be harder to find but is the version most often played on the radio. The different versions were recorded for the mono (single) and stereo (album) releases of the song.

Personnel
Vocals by Sam Moore and Dave Prater
Instrumentation by Booker T. & the M.G.'s and the Mar-Keys Horns
Booker T. Jones – piano
Isaac Hayes – organ
Steve Cropper – guitar
Donald "Duck" Dunn – bass
Al Jackson Jr. – drums
Wayne Jackson – trumpet
Charles "Packy" Axton – tenor saxophone
Don Nix – baritone saxophone

Cover versions

 Paul Revere & the Raiders covered "Soul Man" on their 1968 album Goin' to Memphis.
 Psychedelic band Rotary Connection covered the song with added elements of Baroque music in their eponymous 1968 debut album.
 Los Quandos, a Spanish vocal group, released the first version with Spanish lyrics, written by Jose Manuel Vidal and included in a compilation, released by the Marfer Records label, titled Marfer Parade, published in 1968.
 James Brown band member Sweet Charles Sherrell recorded the song for his 1974 debut solo album Sweet Charles: For Sweet People, on Brown's People Records label.
 The Blues Brothers performed the song as the "cold opener" of a November 1978 episode of Saturday Night Live; they later released the song as a single, which reached number 14 in February 1979 and number 19 in Canada in February 1979.  Cash Box said of it that " Belushi's vocals are honestly effective and decidedly tongue-in-cheek." It was also used as the theme for the late 1990s ABC sitcom Soul Man, which starred Dan Aykroyd.
 The song was performed by Lou Reed and Sam Moore on the soundtrack to the 1986 comedy film Soul Man, supported by a music video. This version reached number 30 in the UK Singles Chart.
 In 1989, the reggae band Los Pericos from Argentina made their cover of the theme for his album Maxi Brites.
 Howard Hewett covered "Soul Man" as a placeholder theme song for Season 2 of the ABC television series Hangin' with Mr. Cooper in 1993, starring Mark Curry. The song was a temporary replacement for the original theme song, which was performed by cast members Holly Robinson and Dawnn Lewis, who left the cast after the end of Season 1 and was ultimately a result of Lewis's departure.
 Ted Nugent often performs "Soul Man" in his live shows, as did Prince during his 2004 Musicology tour.
 In 2004, the song was performed by the comedy duo Drake Bell and Josh Peck on their sitcom, Drake & Josh, in the episode "Blues Brothers". The song appeared on the show's soundtrack, released in 2005.
 In 2007, Australian singer Guy Sebastian covered the song for his fourth album, The Memphis Album, which featured Steve Cropper and Donald "Duck" Dunn, both of whom had performed on the original recording of "Soul Man" 40 years earlier, and both of whom were also members of the Blues Brothers's band.
 In 2012, Jermaine Paul, winner of the second season of The Voice, released it as a single in which he was joined by his mentor and winning coach Blake Shelton. The single reached number 108, appearing in the Bubbling Under Hot 100 Singles.

Chart history

Weekly charts
Sam & Dave

Blues Brothers

Year-end charts

References

External links
 
 
 

Songs about soul
Sam & Dave songs
1967 singles
1978 debut singles
Grammy Hall of Fame Award recipients
The Blues Brothers songs
Songs written by Isaac Hayes
Songs written by David Porter (musician)
Guy Sebastian songs
1967 songs
Stax Records singles
Atlantic Records singles
United States National Recording Registry recordings
Cashbox number-one singles